Auch Cathedral is a Roman Catholic church located in the town of Auch in the Midi-Pyrénées, France. It is a national monument, and is the seat of the Archbishopric of Auch. Under the Concordat of 1801, the ecclesiastical office was dissolved and annexed to the Diocese of Agen, but re-established in 1822. It was granted the status of a basilica minor on 25 April 1928. The cathedral contains a suite of 18 Renaissance stained glass windows by Arnaud de Moles.

Notes and references

External links

Location
Virtual tour of the cathedral

Roman Catholic cathedrals in France
Churches in Gers
Basilica churches in France
World Heritage Sites in France